Glutaminase (glutaminase I, L-glutaminase, glutamine aminohydrolase) is an amidohydrolase enzyme that generates glutamate from glutamine. Glutaminase has tissue-specific isoenzymes. Glutaminase has an important role in glial cells.

Glutaminase catalyzes the following reaction:

Glutamine + H2O → glutamate + NH3

Tissue distribution 

Glutaminase is expressed and active in periportal hepatocytes, where it generates NH3 (ammonia) for urea synthesis, as does glutamate dehydrogenase. Glutaminase is also expressed in the epithelial cells of the renal tubules, where the produced ammonia is excreted as ammonium ions. This excretion of ammonium ions is an important mechanism of renal acid-base regulation. During chronic acidosis, glutaminase is induced in the kidney, which leads to an increase in the amount of ammonium ions excreted. Glutaminase can also be found in the intestines, whereby hepatic portal ammonia can reach as high as 0.26 mM (compared to an arterial blood ammonia of 0.02 mM).

One of the most important roles of glutaminase is found in the axonal terminals of neurons in the central nervous system.  Glutamate is the most abundantly used excitatory neurotransmitter in the CNS.  After being released into the synapse for neurotransmission, glutamate is rapidly taken up by nearby astrocytes, which convert it to glutamine.  This glutamine is then supplied to the presynaptic terminals of the neurons, where glutaminases convert it back to glutamate for loading into synaptic vesicles.  Although both "kidney-type" (GLS1) and "liver-type" (GLS2) glutaminases are expressed in brain, GLS2 has been reported to exist only in cellular nuclei in CNS neurons.

Regulation 

ADP is the strongest adenine nucleotide activator of glutaminase. Studies have also suggested ADP lowered the Km for glutamine and increased the Vmax.  They found that these effects were increased even more when ATP was present.

Phosphate-activated mitochondrial glutaminase (GLS1) is suggested to be linked with elevated metabolism, decreased intracellular reactive oxygen species (ROS) levels, and overall decreased DNA oxidation in both normal and stressed cells. It is suggested that GLS2's control of ROS levels facilitates “the ability of p53 to protect cells from accumulation of genomic damage and allows cells to survive after mild and repairable genotoxic stress.”

Structure 

The structure of glutaminase has been determined using X-ray diffraction to a resolution of up to 1.73 Å. There are 2 chains containing 305 residues that make up the length of this dimeric protein. On each strand, 23% of the amino acid content, or 71 residues, are found in the 8 helices. Twenty-one percent, or 95 residues, make up the 23 beta sheet strands.

Isozymes 

Humans express 4 isoforms of glutaminase. GLS encodes 2 types of kidney-type glutaminase with a high activity and low Km. GLS2 encodes 2 forms of liver-type glutaminase with a low activity and allosteric regulation.

Related proteins
Glutaminases belong to a larger family that includes serine-dependent beta-lactamases and penicillin-binding proteins. Many bacteria have two isozymes. This model is based on selected known glutaminases and their homologs within prokaryotes, with the exclusion of highly derived (long-branch) and architecturally varied homologs, so as to achieve conservative assignments. A sharp drop in scores occurs below 250, and cutoffs are set accordingly. The enzyme converts glutamine to glutamate, with the release of ammonia. Members tend to be described as glutaminase A (glsA), where B (glsB) is unknown and may not be homologous (as in Rhizobium etli; some species have two isozymes that may both be designated A (GlsA1 and GlsA2).

Clinical significance
Many cancers rely on glutaminase thus glutaminase inhibitors have been proposed as a cancer treatment.  some glutaminase inhibitors are in mid-stage clinical trials.
In 2021, it was reported that a GLS1 inhibitor eliminated senescent cells from various organs and tissues in aged mice, ameliorating age-associated tissue dysfunction.  Results suggest that senescent cells rely on glutaminolysis, and inhibition of glutaminase 1 may offer a promising strategy for inducing senolysis in vivo.

References

External links 
 
 Research information on glutaminase (WikiGenes)

EC 3.5.1
Glutamate (neurotransmitter)